The Xinjiang internment camps, officially called vocational education and training centers by the government of China, are internment camps operated by the government of Xinjiang and the Chinese Communist Party Provincial Standing Committee. Human Rights Watch says that they have been used to indoctrinate Uyghurs and other Muslims since 2017 as part of a "people's war on terror", a policy announced in 2014. The camps have been criticized by the governments of many countries and human rights organizations for alleged human rights abuses, including mistreatment, rape, and torture, with some of them alleging genocide. Some 40 countries around the world have called on China to respect the human rights of the Uyghur community, including countries such as Canada, Germany, Turkey, Honduras and Japan. The governments of more than 35 countries have expressed support for China's government.

The camps were established in 2017 by the administration of CCP general secretary Xi Jinping. Between 2017 and 2021 operations were led by Chen Quanguo, who was formerly a CCP Politburo member and the committee secretary who led the region's party committee and government. The camps are reportedly operated outside the Chinese legal system; many Uyghurs have reportedly been interned without trial and no charges have been levied against them (held in administrative detention). Local authorities are reportedly holding hundreds of thousands of Uyghurs in these camps as well as members of other ethnic minority groups in China, for the stated purpose of countering extremism and terrorism and promoting social integration.

The internment of Uyghurs and other Turkic Muslims in the camps constitutes the largest-scale arbitrary detention of ethnic and religious minorities since World War II. , it was estimated that Chinese authorities may have detained up to 1.8 million people, mostly Uyghurs but also including Kazakhs, Kyrgyz and other ethnic Turkic Muslims, Christians, as well as some foreign citizens including Kazakhstanis, in these secretive internment camps located throughout the region. 
  
In May 2018, Randall Schriver, US Assistant Secretary of Defense for Indo-Pacific Security Affairs, said that "at least a million but likely closer to three million citizens" were imprisoned in detention centers, which he described as "concentration camps". In August 2018, Gay McDougall, a US representative at the United Nations Committee on the Elimination of Racial Discrimination, said that the committee had received many credible reports that 1 million ethnic Uyghurs in China have been held in "re-education camps". There have been comparisons between the Xinjiang camps and the Chinese Cultural Revolution.

In 2019, at the United Nations, 54 countries, including China itself, rejected the allegations and supported the Chinese government's policies in Xinjiang. In another letter, 23 countries shared the concerns in the committee's reports and called on China to uphold human rights. In September 2020, the Australian Strategic Policy Institute (ASPI) reported in its Xinjiang Data Project that construction of camps continued despite government claims that their function was winding down. In October 2020, it was reported that the total number of countries that denounced China increased to 39, while the total number of countries that defended China decreased to 45. Sixteen countries that defended China in 2019 did not do so in 2020.

Background

Xinjiang conflict

Various Chinese dynasties have historically exerted various degrees of control and influence over parts of what is modern-day Xinjiang. The region came under complete Chinese rule as a result of the westward expansion of the Manchu-led Qing dynasty, which also conquered Tibet and Mongolia. This conquest, which marked the beginning of Xinjiang under Qing rule, ended circa 1758. While it was nominally declared to be a part of China's core territory, it was generally seen as a distant land unto its own by the imperial court; in 1758, it was designated a penal colony and a site of exile, and as a result, it was governed as a military protectorate, not integrated as a province.

After the 1928 assassination of Yang Zengxin, the governor of the semi-autonomous Kumul Khanate in east Xinjiang under the Republic of China, Jin Shuren succeeded Yang as governor of the Khanate. On the death of the Kamul Khan Maqsud Shah in 1930, Jin entirely abolished the Khanate and took control of the region as its warlord. In 1933, the breakaway First East Turkestan Republic was established in the Kumul Rebellion. In 1934, the First Turkestan Republic was conquered by warlord Sheng Shicai with the aid of the Soviet Union before Sheng reconciled with the Republic of China in 1942. In 1944, the Ili Rebellion led to the Second East Turkestan Republic with dependency on the Soviet Union for trade, arms, and "tacit consent" for its continued existence before being absorbed into the People's Republic of China in 1949.

From the 1950s to the 1970s, the government sponsored a mass migration of Han Chinese to the region, policies promoting Chinese cultural unity, and policies punishing certain expressions of Uyghur identity. During this time, militant Uyghur separatist organizations with potential support from the Soviet Union emerged, with the East Turkestan People's Party being the largest in 1968. During the 1970s, the Soviets supported the United Revolutionary Front of East Turkestan (URFET) to fight the Chinese.

In 1997, a police roundup and execution of 30 suspected separatists during Ramadan led to large demonstrations in February 1997 that resulted in the Ghulja incident, a People's Liberation Army (PLA) crackdown that led to at least nine deaths. The Ürümqi bus bombings later that month killed nine people and injured 68 with responsibility acknowledged by Uyghur exile groups. In March 1997, a bus bomb killed two people with responsibility claimed by Uyghur radicals and the Turkey-based Organisation for East Turkistan Freedom.

In July 2009, riots broke out in Xinjiang in response to a violent dispute between Uyghur and Han Chinese workers in a factory and they resulted in over 100 deaths. Following the riots, Uyghur radicals killed dozens of Chinese citizens in coordinated attacks from 2009 to 2016. These included the August 2009 syringe attacks, the 2011 bomb-and-knife attack in Hotan, the March 2014 knife attack in the Kunming railway station, the April 2014 bomb-and-knife attack in the Ürümqi railway station, and the May 2014 car-and-bomb attack in an Ürümqi street market. Several of the attacks were orchestrated by the Turkistan Islamic Party (formerly the East Turkestan Islamic Movement) which has been designated a terrorist organization by several countries including Russia, Turkey, the United Kingdom, and the United States (until 2020), in addition to the United Nations.

Strategic motivations
After initially denying the existence of the camps the Chinese government has maintained that its actions in Xinjiang are justifiable responses to the threats of extremism and terrorism.

As a region on the northwestern periphery of China which is inhabited by ethnic/linguistic/religious minorities, Xinjiang has been said (by Raffi Khatchadourian) to have "never seemed fully within the Communist Party's grasp". Part of Xinjiang was once seized by Czarist Russia and it was also independent for a short period of time. Traditionally, the government of the People's Republic of China has favored an assimilationist policy towards minorities and it has accelerated this policy by encouraging the mass immigration of Han Chinese into minority lands. After the collapse of its rival and neighbor the Soviet Union—another huge multi-national communist state with one dominant ethnicity—the Chinese Communist Party was "convinced that ethnic nationalism had helped tear the former superpower to pieces". In addition, terrorist attacks were committed by Uyghurs in 2009, 2013, and 2014.

Several additional potential motives for the increased repression in Xinjiang have been presented by scholars who have conducted research outside China. First, the repression may simply be the result of increased dissent within the region beginning in circa 2009; second, it may be due to changes in minority policy which promoted assimilation into Han culture; and third, the repression may primarily be spearheaded by Chen Quanguo himself, the result of his personally hardline attitude towards perceived acts of sedition.

China's government has used the terrorist attacks of 9/11 as a justification for its actions against the Uyghurs. It claims that its actions in Xinjiang are necessary because Xinjiang is another front in the "global war on terrorism." Specifically, they are trying to rid China of the Shanghai Cooperation Organization's three evils. The three evils are "transnational terrorism, separatism, and religious extremism," all three of which the CCP believes the Uyghurs possess. The true reason for the repression of the Uyghurs is quite convoluted but some argue that this is based on the CCP's desire to preserve China's identity and integrity, rather than its desire to condemn terrorism.

Additionally, some analysts have suggested that the ruling Communist Party considers Xinjiang a key route in China's Belt and Road Initiative (BRI), however, it considers Xinjiang's local population a potential threat to the initiative's success, or it fears that opening Xinjiang up may also open it up to radicalizing influences from other states which are participating in the BRI. Sean Roberts of George Washington University said the CCP sees Uyghurs' attachment to their traditional lands as a risk to the BRI. Researcher Adrian Zenz has suggested that the initiative is an important reason for the Chinese government's control of Xinjiang.

In November 2020, when the US dropped the Turkistan Islamic Party from its terrorist list because it was no longer "in existence", the decision was lauded by some intelligence officials because it removed the pretext for the Chinese government's decision to wage "terrorism eradication" campaigns against the Uyghurs. However, Yue Gang, a military commentator in Beijing stated, "in the wake of the US decision on the ETIM, China might seek to increase its counterterrorism activities." The group continues to be designated as a terrorist group by the United Nations Security Council as well as by the governments of other countries.

Policies from 2009 to 2016

Both prior to and until shortly after the July 2009 Ürümqi riots, Wang Lequan was the Party Secretary for the Xinjiang region, effectively the highest subnational role; roughly equivalent to a governor in a Western province or state. Wang worked on modernization programs in Xinjiang, including industrialization, development of commerce, roads, railways, hydrocarbon development and pipelines with neighboring Kazakhstan to eastern China. Wang also constrained local culture and religion, replaced the Uyghur language with Standard Mandarin as the medium of education in primary schools, and penalized or banned among government workers (in a region in which the government was a very large employer), the wearing of beards and headscarves, religious fasting and praying while on the job. In the 1990s, many Uyghurs in parts of Xinjiang could not speak Mandarin Chinese.

In April 2010, after the Ürümqi riots, Zhang Chunxian replaced Wang Lequan as the Communist Party chief. Zhang Chunxian continued and strengthened Wang's repressive policies. In 2011, Zhang proposed "modern culture leads the development in Xinjiang" as his policy statement and started to implement his modern culture propaganda. In 2012, he first mentioned the phrase "de-extremification" campaigns and started to educate "wild Imams" and extremists.

In 2013, the Belt and Road Initiative was announced, a massive trade project at the heart of which is Xinjiang. In 2014, Chinese authorities announced a "people's war on terror" and local government introduced new restrictions, including a ban on long beards and wearing the burqa in public. In 2014, the concept of "transformation through education" began to be used in contexts outside of Falun Gong through the systematic "de-extremification" campaigns. Under Zhang, the Communist Party launched its "Strike Hard Campaign against Violent Terrorism" in Xinjiang.

In August 2016, Chen Quanguo, a well-known hardline Communist Party secretary in Tibet, took charge of the Xinjiang autonomous region. Chen was branded as responsible for a major component of Tibet's "subjugation" by critics.

Following Chen's arrival, local authorities recruited over 90,000 police officers in 2016 and 2017 – twice as many as they recruited in the past seven years, and laid out as many as 7,300 heavily guarded check points in the region. The province has come to be known as one of the most heavily policed regions of the world. English-language news reports have labelled the current regime in Xinjiang as the most extensive police state in the world.

Antireligious campaigns in China

As a communist country, China does not have an official state religion, However, its government recognizes five different religious denominations, namely Buddhism, Taoism, Islam, Catholicism, and Protestantism. In 2014, Western media outlets reported that it has conducted antireligious campaigns in order to promote atheism. According to The Washington Post, the CCP under Xi Jinping shifted its policies in favor of the outright sinicization of ethnic and religious minorities. The trend accelerated in 2018 when the State Ethnic Affairs Commission and the State Administration for Religious Affairs were placed under the control of the CCP's United Front Work Department.

Groups that are targeted for surveillance
Around 2015, according to Chinese Human Rights Defenders, a senior CCP official argued that "a third" of Xinjiang's Uyghurs were "polluted by religious extremist forces," and needed to be "educated and reformed through concentrated force."

At about the same time, the Chinese state-security apparatus was developing a "Integrated Joint Operations Platform" (IJOP) to analyze information which was collected from its surveillance data.  According to an analysis of this software by Human Rights Watch, a member of a minority group might be assessed by the IJOP as falling under one of 36 "person types" that could lead to  arrest and internment in a re-education camp. Some of these person types included:
people who do not use a mobile phone, 
who use the back door instead of the front, 
who consume an "unusual" amount of electricity, 
have an "abnormal" beard,
socialize too little,
maintain "complex" relationships, 
have a family member that exhibits some of these traits and so is "insufficiently loyal".

History

Beginning in 2017, local media outlets generally referred to the facilities as "counter-extremism training centers" and "education and transformation training centers". Most of those facilities were converted from existing schools or other official buildings, although some of them were purpose-built.

The heavily policed region and thousands of check points assisted and accelerated the detention of locals in the camps. In 2017 the region constituted 21% of all arrests in China despite comprising less than 2% of the national population, eight times more than the previous year. The judicial and other government bureaus of many cities and counties started to release a series of procurement and construction bids for those planned camps and facilities. Increasingly, massive detention centers were built up throughout the region and are being used to hold hundreds of thousands of people targeted for their religious practices and ethnicity.

Victor Shih, a political economist at the University of California, San Diego, said in July 2019 the mass internments were unnecessary because "no active insurgencies" existed, only "isolated terrorist incidents". He suggested that because a great deal of money was spent setting up the camps, the money likely went to associates of the politicians who created them.

According to the Chinese ambassador to Australia Cheng Jingye in December 2019, all of the "trainees" in the centers have graduated and have gradually returned to their jobs or found new jobs with government assistance. Cheng also called reports that one million Uyghurs had been detained in Xinjiang "fake news" and that "what has been done in Xinjiang has no ... difference with what the other countries, including western countries, [do] to fight against terrorists."

During the COVID-19 pandemic in mainland China, there were no reports of cases of the coronavirus in Xinjiang prisons or of conditions in the internment camps. After program suspensions due to the 2019–20 coronavirus pandemic, Uyghur workers were reported to have been returned to other parts of Xinjiang and the rest of China to resume work beginning in March 2020. In September 2020, the Australian Strategic Policy Institute (ASPI) launched its Xinjiang Data Project, which reported that construction of camps continued despite claims that their function was winding down, with 380 camps and detention centers identified.

The Muslim-majority countries like the UAE, Saudi Arabia and Egypt were showing open support towards the Asian nation, stating that "China has the right to take anti‐terrorism and de‐extremism measures". The Arab nations were neglecting the human rights abuses to not ruin the economic ties they maintained with China, which is a crucial trading partner and investor for these countries. Moreover, the exiled Uyghur Muslims in these countries were regularly being detained and deported back to China.

According to the Associated Press, a young Chinese woman, Wu Huan was captured for eight days in a Chinese-run secret detention site in Dubai. She revealed that at least two other Uyghur prisoners were detained with her at a villa turned into jail. Critics have largely criticized the UAE for its supporting role in detaining as well as deporting the Uyghur Muslims and other Chinese political dissidents at the orders of the Chinese government.

Leaks and hacks

The New York Times leak

On 16 November 2019, The New York Times released an extensive leak of 400 pages of documents, sourced from a member of the Chinese government, in the hope that CCP General Secretary Xi Jinping would be held accountable for his actions. The New York Times stated that the leak suggests discontent inside the Communist Party relating to the crackdown in Xinjiang. The anonymous government official who leaked the documents did so with the intent that the disclosure "would prevent party leaders, including Mr. Xi, from escaping culpability for the mass detentions."

We must be as harsh as them and show absolutely no mercy. — Xi Jinping on the terror attacks in 2014, (translated from Mandarin Chinese)

One document was a manual aimed at communicating messages to Uyghur students who were returning home and would ask about their missing friends or relatives who had been interned in the camps. It said that government staff should acknowledge that the internees had not committed a crime and that "it is just that their thinking has been infected by unhealthy thoughts." Officials were directed to say that even grandparents and family members who seemed too old to carry out violence could not be spared.

The New York Times stated that speeches obtained show how Xi views risks to the party similar to the collapse of the Soviet Union, which The New York Times stated Xi "blamed on ideological laxity and spineless leadership." Concerned that violence in the Xinjiang region could damage social stability in the rest of China, Xi stated "social stability will suffer shocks, the general unity of people of every ethnicity will be damaged, and the broad outlook for reform, development and stability will be affected." Xi encouraged officials to study how the US responded following the September 11 attacks. Xi likened Islamic extremism alternately to a virus-like contagion and a dangerously addictive drug, and declared that addressing it would require "a period of painful, interventionary treatment."

The China Daily reported in 2018 that CCP official Wang Yongzhi was removed for "serious disciplinary violations." The New York Times obtained a copy of Wang's confession (which the report noted was likely signed under duress) and stated that The New York Times believed he was sacked for being too lenient on Uyghurs, for example his release of 7,000 detainees. Wang had told his superiors that he was concerned that the actions against the Uyghurs would breed discontent and thus result in greater violence in the future. The leaked documents stated, "he ignored the party central leadership's strategy for Xinjiang, and he went as far as brazen defiance. ... He refused, to round up everyone who should be rounded up". The article was discreetly shared on the Chinese platform Sina Weibo, where some netizens expressed sympathy for him. In 2017, there were more than 12,000 investigations into party members in Xinjiang for infractions or resistance in the "fight against separatism," which was more than 20 times the figure in the previous year.

ICIJ leak

On 24 November 2019, the International Consortium of Investigative Journalists (ICIJ) published the China Cables, consisting of six documents, an "operations manual" for running the camps and detailed use of predictive policing and artificial intelligence to target people and regulate life inside the camps.

Shortly after the publication of the China Cables, leaker Asiye Abdulaheb went on to provide Adrian Zenz with the "Karakax list", allegedly a Chinese government spreadsheet that tracks the rationale behind 311 of the internments at a "Vocational Training Internment Camp" in the seat of Karakax County in Xinjiang. The purpose of the list may have been to coordinate judgments on whether an individual should remain in internment; in some entries, the word "agree" was written beside a judgment. Records detail how subjects dress and pray, and how their relatives and acquaintances behave. One subject was interned because she wore a veil years ago; another was interned for clicking on a link to a foreign website; a third was interned for applying for a passport, despite posing "no practical risk" according to the spreadsheet. In general, the subjects on the Karakax list all have relatives living abroad, a category that reportedly leads to "almost certain internment." 149 subjects are documented as violating birth control policies. 116 of the subjects are listed without explanation as "untrustworthy"; for 88 of these, this "untrustworthy" label is the only reason listed for internment. Younger men, in particular, are often listed as "untrustworthy person born in a certain decade". 24 subjects are accused of formal crimes, including six terrorism-related allegations. Most of the subjects have been released, or scheduled for release, following the end of their one-year internment term; however, some of these are recommended for release into "industrial park employment", raising concerns about possible forced labor.

Xinjiang Police Files hack

The 'Xinjiang Police Files', a large body of police files derived from data found in a hack of a local computer server, was sent to the German anthropologist Adrian Zenz, who works for the Victims of Communism Memorial Foundation. Zenz has been sanctioned by the Chinese government since 2021. He has been instrumental in exposing the camp system in Xinjiang. The files and some English translations are partly accessible via their special homepage set up by this foundation or via the links to an academic repository in Zenz' article in the Journal of the European Association for Chinese Studies.

The data was evaluated by journalists from 14 media companies worldwide, including the British BBC, Le Monde in France and El País in Spain. In Germany, Bayerischer Rundfunk and Der Spiegel examined and researched the data.

According to the evaluation of a number of digital forensic scientists and other experts, the Xinjiang Police Files come from the computers of the Chinese authorities. It is the largest data leak on Chinese state-run re-education camps that has been made public outside of China to date.

In May 2022, the BBC published summaries of the Xinjiang Police Files. The Xinjiang Police Files were published during the first visit by a UN human rights commissioner to China in 14 years. By combining the photographs of some 5,000 Uyghurs contained in the data with other data in the hack, details of over 2,800 detentions emerged. Other documents in the leak included police protocols for running an internment camp.

Camp facilities
In urban areas, most of the camps are converted from existing vocational schools, CCP schools, ordinary schools or other official buildings, while in suburban or rural areas the majority of camps were specially built for the purposes of re-education. These camps are guarded by armed forces or special police and equipped with prison-like gates, surrounding walls, security fences, surveillance systems, watchtowers, guard rooms, and facilities for armed police.

While there is no public, verifiable data for the number of camps, there have been various attempts to document suspected camps based on satellite imagery and government documents. On 15 May 2017, Jamestown Foundation, a Washington, DC-based think tank, released a list of 73 government bids related to re-education facilities. On 1 November 2018, the Australian Strategic Policy Institute (ASPI) reported on suspected camps in 28 locations. On 29 November 2018, Reuters and Earthrise Media reported 39 suspected camps. The East Turkistan National Awakening Movement reported an even larger numbers of camps.

In a 2018 report from US government-funded Radio Free Asia, Awat County (Awati) was said to have three re-education camps. An RFA listener provided a copy of a "confidentiality agreement" requiring re-education camp detainees to not discuss the workings of the camps, and said local residents were instructed to tell members of re-education camp inspection teams visiting No. 2 Re-education Camp that there was only one camp in the county. The RFA listener also said the No. 2 Re-education Camp had transferred thousands of detainees and removed barbed wire from the perimeter of the camp walls.

Boarding schools for the children of detainees 
The detention of Uyghurs and other ethnic minorities has allegedly left many children without their parents. The Chinese government has allegedly held these children at a variety of institutions and schools colloquially known as "boarding schools," although not all are residential institutions, that serve as de facto orphanages. In September 2018, the Associated Press reported that thousands of boarding schools were being built. According to the Chinese Department of Education children as young as eight are enrolled in these schools.

According to Adrian Zenz and BBC in 2019, children of detained parents in boarding schools were penalized for failing to speak Mandarin Chinese and prevented from exercising their religion. In a paper published in the Journal of Political Risk, Zenz calls the effort a "systematic campaign of social re-engineering and cultural genocide". Human Rights Watch said that the children detained at child welfare facilities and boarding schools were held without parental consent or access. In December 2019, The New York Times reported that approximately 497,000 elementary and junior high school students were enrolled in these boarding schools. They also reported that students are only allowed to see family members once every two weeks and that they were forbidden from speaking the Uyghur language.

Locations

Numerous locations have been identified as re-education camps. The Australian Strategic Policy Institute, whose funding is primarily from the Australian Government with overseas funding primarily from the US State Department and Department of Defense, had identified more than 380 "suspected detention facilities". 
Camps in Akto County (Aktu, Aketao), Kizilsu Kyrgyz Autonomous Prefecture
Four detention centers in Aksu City (Akesu), Aksu Prefecture
Artux City Vocational Skills Education Training Service Center in Artux in Kizilsu Prefecture
Jiashi County Secondary Vocational School in Payzawat County (Jiashi), Kashgar Prefecture
Three detention centers in Kalpin County (Kelpin, Keping), Aksu Prefecture
Eight vocational training centres in Lop County (Luopu), Hotan Prefecture
Lop County No. 4 Vocational Skills Education and Training Center

Maralbexi County (Bachu County) re-education camp in Kashgar Prefecture
Eight camps in Turfan Prefecture
No. 4 Training Center (on the road between Turpan and Toksun County)
Three re-education camps in Uqturpan County (Uchturpan, Wushi), Aksu Prefecture
Yutian county vocational training centre in Yutian County (Keriya), Hotan Prefecture, among the largest of the camps

Camp detainees

The mass internment of Uyghurs and other Turkic Muslims in the camps has become largest-scale arbitrary detention of ethnic and religious minorities since World War II.

Many media outlets have reported that hundreds of thousands of Uyghurs, as well as Kazakhs, Kyrgyz and other ethnic minorities, are held in the camps. Radio Free Asia, a news service funded by the US government, estimated in January 2018 that 120,000 members of the Uyghurs were being held in political re-education camps in Kashgar prefecture alone at the time. In 2018, local government authorities in Qira County expected to have almost 12,000 detainees in vocational camps and detention centres and some projects related to the centres outstripped budgetary limits. Reports of Uyghurs living or studying abroad being detained upon return to Xinjiang are common, which is thought to be connected to the re-education camps. Many living abroad have gone for years without being able to contact their family members still in Xinjiang, who may be detainees.

Uyghur political figure Rebiya Kadeer, who has been in exile since 2005, has had as many as 30 relatives detained or disappeared, including her sisters, brothers, children, grandchildren, and siblings, according to Amnesty International. It is unclear when they were taken away. On February 2021, two of Kadeer's granddaughters appeared in a video on Twitter denying abuses and telling her not to be "fooled again by those bad foreigners".

On 13 July 2018, Sayragul Sauytbay, an ethnic Kazakh Chinese national and former employee of the Chinese state, appeared in a court in the city of Zharkent, Kazakhstan for being accused of illegally crossing the border between the two countries. During the trial she talked about her forced work at a re-education camp for 2,500 ethnic Kazakhs. Her lawyer argued that if she is extradited to China, she would face the death penalty for exposing re-education camps in Kazakh court. Her testimony for the re-education camps have become the focus of a court case in Kazakhstan, which is also testing the country's ties with Beijing. On 1 August 2018, Sauytbay was released with a six-month suspended sentence and directed to regularly check-in with police. She applied for asylum in Kazakhstan to avoid deportation to China. Kazakhstan refused her application. On 2 June 2019 she flew to Sweden where she was subsequently granted political asylum.

According to a Radio Free Asia interview with an officer at the Onsu County police station, as of August 2018, 30,000 persons, or about one in six Uyghurs in the county (approximately 16% of the overall population of the county), were detained in re-education camps.

Gene Bunin created the Xinjiang Victims Database to collect public testimonies on people detained in the camps. Each page lists basic demographic information including dates and suspected cause of detention, location, in addition to supplementary videos, photos and documents.

Writing in the Journal of Political Risk in July 2019, independent researcher Adrian Zenz estimated an upper speculative limit to the number of people detained in Xinjiang re-education camps at 1.5 million. In November 2019, Adrian Zenz estimated that the number of internment camps in Xinjiang had surpassed 1,000. In November 2019, George Friedman estimated that 1 in 10 Uyghurs are being detained in re-education camps.

When the BBC was invited to the camps in June 2019, officials there told them the detainees were "almost criminals" who could choose "between a judicial hearing or education in the de-extremification facilities". The Globe and Mail reported in September 2019 that some Han Chinese and Christian Uyghurs in Xinjiang who had disputes with local authorities or expressed politically unwelcome thoughts had also been sent to the camps.

Anonymous drone footage posted on YouTube in September 2019 showed kneeling blindfolded inmates that an analyst at the Australian Strategic Policy Institute said may have been an inmate transfer at a train station near Korla and may have been from a re-education camp.

Anar Sabit, an ethnic Kazakh from Kuytun living in Canada who was imprisoned in 2017 after returning home following the death of her father, was detained for having gone abroad. She found other minorities were interned for offenses such as using forbidden technology (WhatsApp, a V.P.N.), travelling abroad, but that even a Uyghur working for the Communist party as a propagandist could be interned for the offense of having been booked in a hotel by an airline with others who were under suspicion.

According to an anonymous Uyghur local government employee quoted in an article by US government-sponsored Radio Free Asia, during Ramadan 2020 (23 April to 23 May), residents of Makit County (Maigaiti), Kashgar Prefecture were told they could face punishment for religious fasting including being sent to a re-education camp.

According to a Human Rights Watch report published in January 2021, the official figure of people put through this system is 1.3 million.

Waterboarding, mass rape, and sexual abuse are reported to be among the forms of torture used as part of the indoctrination process at the camps.

Testimonies about treatment
Officially, the camps are known as Vocational Education and Training Centers, informally as "schools", and described by some officials as "hospitals" where inmates are treated for the "disease" of "extremist ideology". According to interment officials quoted in Xinjiang Daily, (a Communist Party-run newspaper)  while  "requirements for our students" are "strict ... we have a gentle attitude, and put our hearts into treating them". Being in one "is actually like staying at a boarding school." The newspaper quoted a former inmates as stating during his internment he had realized he had been "increasingly drifting away from 'home,'" under the influence of extremism. "With the government's help and education, I've returned. ... "our lives are improving every day. No matter who you are, first and foremost you are a Chinese citizen.'"  Testimonies in non-Communist Party literature from freed inmates have been considerably different.

Kayrat Samarkand, a Kazakh citizen who migrated from Xinjiang, was detained in one of the internment camps in the region for three months for visiting neighboring Kazakhstan. On 15 February 2018, Kazakh Foreign Minister Kairat Abdrakhmanov sent a diplomatic note to the Chinese Foreign Ministry, the same day as Kayrat Samarkand was freed from custody.  After his release, Samarkand said that he faced endless brainwashing and humiliation, and that he was forced to study communist propaganda for hours every day and chant slogans giving thanks and wishing for a long life to Xi Jinping.

Mihrigul Tursun, a Uyghur woman detained in China, after escaping one of these camps, talked of beatings and torture. After moving to Egypt, she traveled to China in 2015 to spend time with her family and was immediately detained and separated from her infant children. When Tursun was released three months later, one of the triplets had died and the other two had developed health problems. Tursun said the children had been operated on. She was arrested for the second time about two years later. Several months later, she was detained the third time and spent three months in a cramped prison cell with 60 other women, having to sleep in turns, use the toilet in front of security cameras and sing songs praising the Chinese Communist Party.

Tursun said she and other inmates were forced to take unknown medication, including pills that made them faint and a white liquid that caused bleeding in some women and loss of menstruation in others. Tursun said nine women from her cell died during her three months there. One day, Tursun recalled, she was led into a room and placed in a high chair, and her legs and arms were locked in place. "The authorities put a helmet-like thing on my head, and each time I was electrocuted, my whole body would shake violently and I would feel the pain in my veins," Tursun said in a statement read by a translator. "I don't remember the rest. White foam came out of my mouth, and I began to lose consciousness," Tursun said. "The last word I heard them saying is that you being an Uyghur is a crime." She was eventually released so that she could take her children to Egypt, but she was ordered to return to China. Once in Cairo, Tursun contacted U.S. authorities and, in September, went to the United States and settled in Virginia.  China's Foreign Ministry Spokesperson Hua Chunying has stated that Tursun was taken into custody by police on "suspicion of inciting ethnic hatred and discrimination" for a period lasting 20 days, but denies that Tursun was detained in a re-education camp.

Former inmates say that they are required to learn to sing the national anthem of China and communist songs. Punishments, like being placed in handcuffs for hours, waterboarding, or being strapped to "tiger chair" (a metal contraption) for long periods of time, are allegedly used on those who fail to follow.

Anar Sabit, a cooperative inmate who had a relatively minor offense of foreign travel, described her confinement in the women's section as prison-like and marked by bureaucratic rigidity but said that she was not beaten or tortured . Before and after her internment, Sabit said that she experienced what Chinese sometimes call gui da qiang, or 'ghost walls' "that confuse and entrap travelers". After her release from internment, she said that she remains a "focus person" in her hometown of Kuytun where she lives with her uncle's family. She described the town as resembling an "open air prison" due to the careful monitoring by cameras, sensors, police, and the neighborhood residential committee, and that she feels shunned by almost all friends and family and worries that she will endanger anyone who helps her. After Sabit moved out of her uncle's house, Sabit lived in the dormitory of the neighborhood residential committee who she said threatened to return her to the internment camp for speaking out of turn.

According to detainees, they were also forced to drink alcohol and eat pork, which are forbidden in Islam. Some reportedly received unknown medicines while others attempted suicide. There have also been deaths reported due to unspecified causes. Detainees have alleged widespread sexual abuse, including forced abortions, forced use of contraceptive devices and compulsory sterilization. It has been reported that Han officials have been assigned to reside in the homes of Uyghurs who are in the camps. Rushan Abbas of the Campaign for Uyghurs argues that the actions of the Chinese government amount to genocide according to United Nations definitions which are laid out in the Genocide Convention.

According to Time, Sarsenbek Akaruli, 45, a veterinarian and trader from Ili, Xinjiang, was arrested in Xinjiang on 2 November 2017. As of November 2019, he is still in a detention camp. According to his wife Gulnur Kosdaulet, Akaruli was put in the camp after police found the banned messaging app WhatsApp on his cell phone. Kosdaulet, a citizen of neighboring Kazakhstan, has traveled to Xinjiang on four occasions to search for her husband but could not get help from friends in the Chinese Communist Party. Kosdaulet said of her friends, "Nobody wanted to risk being recorded on security cameras talking to me in case they ended up in the camps themselves."

In May to June 2017, a woman native to Maralbexi County (Bachu) named Mailikemu Maimati (also spelled Mamiti) was detained in the county's re-education camp according to her husband Mirza Imran Baig. He said that after her release, she and their young son were not given their passports by Chinese authorities.

According to Time, former prisoner Bakitali Nur, 47, native of Khorgos, Xinjiang on the Sino-Kazakh border, was arrested because authorities were suspicious of his frequent trips abroad. He reported spending a year in a cell with seven other prisoners. The prisoners sat on stools seventeen hours a day, were not allowed to talk or move and were under constant surveillance. Movement carried the punishment of being put into stress positions for hours. After release, he was forced to make daily self-criticisms, report on his plans and work for negligible payment in government factories. In May 2019, he escaped to Kazakhstan. Nur summarized his experience in jail and under constant monitoring after his release saying, "The entire system is designed to suppress us."

According to Radio Free Asia, Ghalipjan, a 35 year old Uyghur man from Shanshan/Pichan County who was married and had a five-year-old son, died in a re-education camp on 21 August 2018. Authorities reported his death was due to heart attack, but the head of the Ayagh neighborhood committee said that he was beaten to death by a police officer. His family was not allowed to carry out Islamic funeral rites.

According to the Xinjiang Police Files, Chen Quanguo issued a shooting order for detainees attempting to escape in 2018.

In June 2018, President of the World Uyghur Congress (WUC) Dolkun Isa was told that his mother Ayhan Memet, 78, had died two months earlier while in detention at a "political re-education camp". The WUC president was unsure if she had been incarcerated in one of the many "political re-education camps".

According to a 2018 report in The New York Times, Abdusalam Muhemet, 41, who ran a restaurant in Hotan before fleeing China in 2018, said he spent seven months in prison and more than two months in a camp in Hotan in 2015 without ever being criminally charged. Muhemet said that on most days, the inmates at the camp would assemble to hear long lectures by officials who warned them not to embrace Islamic radicalism, support Uyghur independence or defy the Communist Party.

In an interview with Radio Free Asia, an officer at the Kuqa (Kuchar, Kuche) County Police Department reported that from June to December 2018, 150 people at the No. 1 Internment Camp in the Yengisher district of Kuqa county had died, corroborating earlier reports attributed to Himit Qari, former area police chief.

In August 2020, the BBC released texts and a video smuggled out of a re-education camp by Merdan Ghappar, a former model of Uyghur heritage. Mergan had been allowed access to personal effects, and used a phone to take videos of the camp he is interned in.

In February 2021, the BBC issued further eyewitness accounts of mass rape and torture in the camps. Sayragul Sauytbay told the BBC as a teacher forced to work in the camps that "rape was common" and the guards "picked the girls and young women they wanted and took them away". She also described a woman who was brought to make a forced confession in front of 100 other detainees while the police took turns to rape her as she cried out for help. In 2018, a Globe and Mail interview with Sauytbay found that she did not personally see violence at the camp, but did witness hunger and a complete lack of freedom. Tursunay Ziawudun, a Uyghur who fled to Kazakhstan and then the US, told the BBC that she was raped three times in the camps and kicked in the abdomen during interrogations. In a 2020 interview with Buzzfeed News, Ziawudun reported that she "wasn't beaten or abused" while inside, but was instead subjected to long interrogations, forced to watch propaganda, kept in cold conditions with poor food, and had her hair cut.

Forced labor 
Adrian Zenz reported that the re-education camps also function as forced labor camps in which Uyghurs and Kazakhs produce various products for export, especially those made from cotton grown in Xinjiang. The growing of cotton is central to the industry of the region as "43 percent of Xinjiang's exports are apparel, footwear, or textiles". In 2018, 84% of China's cotton was produced in the Xinjiang province. Since cotton is grown and processed into textiles in Xinjiang, a November 2019 article from The Diplomat said that "the risk of forced labor exists at multiple steps in the creation of a product".

Academics Zhun Xu and Fangfei Lin write that the conclusion of forced labor in cotton production in Xinjiang is insufficiently supported. They cite the historic significance of Uyghur agricultural workers as a long-standing labor force for manual cotton harvesting and staffing companies' widespread recruitment of Uyghur workers due to lower travel costs. In their view, "[T]he labor demand of Uyghur seasonal cotton pickers in south Xinjiang is largely decided by its relatively low degree of agricultural capitalization, not due to the 'special treatment' towards labor migrants of a certain ethnic minority."

Between 2016 and 2018, the centre expanded 269 percent in total area.

The Australian Strategic Policy Institute reported that from 2017 to 2019 more than 80,000 Uyghurs were shipped elsewhere in China for factory jobs that "strongly suggest forced labour". Conditions of these factories were consistent with the stipulations of forced labor as defined by the International Labor Organization.

In 2021, former supplier for Nike, Esquel Group, sued the United States Government for listing it on a sanction list for forced labor allegations in Xinjiang. It was later removed from the sanction list due to lack of evidence provided by the US Commerce department.

In October 2021, the CBC in collaboration with the Investigative Reporting Project Italy along with The Guardian reported on the export of tomato products from Xinjiang and tied to forced labor by the Uyghurs.  The report identified tomato products being exported to other countries such as Italy to be repackaged for sale in other markets such as Canada.

In June 2021, human rights reports indicated that costs of solar modules had been depressed in recent years due to Chinese forced labor practices in the solar module and wind turbine exports industry. Globally, China dominated manufacturing, installation and exports in the field. The practice of forced labor was blamed for the bankruptcy of firms in the US and German solar industries, multiple times, over the decade 2010–2020. In one report, upon declaring a bankruptcy, the cost of raw materials for manufacturing panels was suggested to be 30% of the total manufacturing costs. It was argued that China do not pay labor costs.

Notable detainees

 Ablajan Awut Ayup, rapper
 Merdan Ghappar, model
 Adil Mijit, comedian, suspected detainee
 Mihrigul Tursun (former detainee)

International reactions

Reactions at the UN 
On 8 July 2019, 22 countries issued a statement in which they called for an end to mass detentions in China and expressed their concerns about widespread surveillance and repression. 50 countries issued a counter-statement, reportedly coordinated by Algeria, criticizing the practice of "politicizing human rights issues," stating "China has invited a number of diplomats, international organizations officials and journalist to Xinjiang" and that "what they saw and heard in Xinjiang completely contradicted what was reported in the media." The counter-statement also commended China's "remarkable achievements in the field of human rights", claiming that "safety and security has returned to Xinjiang and the fundamental human rights of people of all ethnic groups there are safeguarded." Qatar formally withdrew its name from the counter-statement on 18 July, six days after it was published, expressing a desire "to maintain a neutral stance and we offer our mediation and facilitation services."

In October 2019, 23 countries issued a joint statement urging China to "uphold its national laws and international obligations and commitments to respect human rights, including freedom of religion or belief," urging China to refrain from "arbitrary detention of Uyghurs and members of other Muslim communities.

In response, on the same day, 54 countries (including China itself) issued a joint statement reiterating that the work of human rights in the United Nations should be conducted in a "non-politicized manner", and supporting China's Xinjiang policies. The statement spoke positively of the results of counter-terrorism and de-radicalization measures in Xinjiang and held that these measures have effectively safeguarded the basic human rights of people of all ethnic groups." Civil society groups in Muslim-majority countries with governments that have supported China's policies in Xinjiang have been noted to be uncomfortable with their governments' stance and have organized boycotts, protests, and media campaigns concerning Uyghurs.

In October 2020, Axios reported that more countries at the UN joined the condemnation of China over Xinjiang abuses. The total number of countries that denounced China increased to 39, while the total number of countries that defended China decreased to 45. Notably, 16 countries that defended China in 2019 did not do so in 2020.

At the 46th session of the Human Rights Council, Cuba delivered a joint statement supporting China, signed by 64 countries.

Reactions by international organizations

Governmental organizations

 On 21 May 2018, during the resumed session of the Committee on Non-Governmental Organizations in the United Nations, Kelley Currie, the United States representative to the United Nations for economic and social affairs, raised the issue of mass detention of Uyghurs in re-education camps, and she said that "reports of mass incarcerations in the Xinjiang were documented by looking at Chinese procurement requests on Chinese websites requesting Chinese companies to tender offers to build political re-education camps".
 On 10 August 2018, United Nations human rights experts expressed alarm over many credible reports that China had detained a million or more ethnic Uyghurs in Xinjiang. Gay McDougall, a member of the United Nations Committee on the Elimination of Racial Discrimination, said that "In the name of combating religious extremism, China had turned Xinjiang into something resembling a massive internment camp, shrouded in secrecy, a sort of no-rights zone".
 On 10 September 2018, UN human rights chief Michelle Bachelet called on China to ease restrictions on her and her office's team, urging China to allow observers into Xinjiang and expressing concern about the situation there. She said, "The UN rights group had shown that Uyghurs and other Muslims are being detained in camps across Xinjiang and I expect discussions with Chinese officials to begin soon".
 In June 2019, UN counter-terrorism chief Vladimir Voronkov visited Xinjiang and found nothing incriminating at the camps.
On 1 November 2019, ten UN Special Rapporteurs together with vice-chair of the UN Working Group on Arbitrary Detention and Chair-Rapporteur of the UN Working Group on Enforced or Involuntary Disappearances released a report on the effect and application of the Counter-Terrorism Law of China and its Regional Implementing Measures in Xinjiang, which states that:The De-Extremism Regulations have been criticised by UN Special Procedures mandates for their lack of compliance with international human rights standards. Following the introduction of those laws, an estimated million Uyghurs and other Turkic Muslims have reportedly been sent to internment facilities under the guise of "counterterrorism and de-extremism" policies since 2016. (p.4) ...... In this context, previous communications by the Special Rapporteur on freedom of religion or belief and the Working Group on Arbitrary Detention have voiced their concern that the "re-education facilities," sometimes termed "vocational training centres," due to their coercive character, amount to detention centres. It is alleged that between 1 million to 1.5 million ethnic Uyghurs and other minorities in Xinjiang may have been arbitrary forced into these facilities, where there have been allegations of deaths in custody, physical and psychological abuse and torture, as well as lack of access to medical care. It is also reported that in several cases they have been denied free contact with their families and friends or been unable to inform them of their location and denied their basic freedom of movement.(p.8)
In June 2020, nearly 50 UN independent experts had repeatedly communicated with the Government of the People's Republic of China their alarm regarding the repression of fundamental freedoms in China. They had also raised their concerns regarding a range of issues of grave concern, including the collective repression of the population, especially religious and ethnic minorities in Xinjiang and Tibet.
In March 2021, sixteen UN human right experts raised grave concerns about the "alleged detention and forced labour of Muslim Uyghurs in China". The experts were appointed by the UN Human Rights Council, and several of them said they had "received information that connected over 150 domestic Chinese and foreign domiciled companies to serious allegations of human rights abuses against Uyghur workers". The experts also called for unrestricted access to China in order to conduct "fact-finding missions", meanwhile urging "global and domestic companies to closely scrutinize their supply chains".

On 11 September 2018, Federica Mogherini, the High Representative of the European Union for Foreign Affairs and Security Policy, raised the re-education camps issue in European Parliament. She said:The most outstanding disagreement we have with China concerns the human rights situation in China, as underlined in your Report. We also focused on the situation in Xinjiang, especially the expansion of political re-education camps. And we discussed the detention of human rights defenders, including particular cases.
On 19 December 2019, the European Parliament passed a non-binding resolution condemning the mass incarceration of Uyghurs and calling on EU companies with supply chains in the region to ensure that they are not complicit with crimes against humanity.
On 17 December 2020, the European Parliament adopted a resolution that strongly condemns China over allegations of forced labor by ethnic and religious minorities. In the statement, the EU body said Parliament "strongly condemns the government-led system of forced labor, in particular the exploitation of Uyghur, ethnic Kazakh and Kyrgyz, and other Muslim minority groups, in factories both within and outside of internment camps in Xinjiang, as well as the transfer of forced laborers to other Chinese administrative divisions, and the fact that well-known European brands and companies have been benefiting from the use of forced labor."
On 22 March 2021, the European Union, joined by the United States, the United Kingdom and Canada, imposed sanctions on four senior Chinese officials and the Public Security Bureau of the Xinjiang Production and Construction Corps over the human rights abuses of Uyghurs in Xinjiang. This was the first sanction by the EU against China since the 1989 Tiananmen Square massacre.

World Bank

 On 11 November 2019, the World Bank issued a statement: In line with standard practice, immediately after receiving a series of serious allegations in August 2019 in connection with the Xinjiang Technical and Vocational Education and Training Project, the Bank launched a fact-finding review, and World Bank senior managers traveled to Xinjiang to gather information directly. After receiving the allegations, no disbursements were made on the project. The team conducted a thorough review of project documents... The review did not substantiate the allegations. In light of the risks associated with the partner schools, which are widely dispersed and difficult to monitor, the scope and footprint of the project is being reduced. Specifically, the project component that involves the partner schools in Xinjiang is being closed.

Organization for Islamic Cooperation
 On 1 March 2019, the OIC produced a document which "commends the efforts of the People's Republic of China in providing care to its Muslim citizens."
 A coalition of American Muslim groups criticized the OIC's decision and accused member states of being influenced by Chinese power. The groups included the Council on American-Islamic Relations.

Human rights organisations 

 On 10 September 2017, Human Rights Watch released a report that said "The Chinese government should immediately free people held in unlawful 'political education' centers in Xinjiang and shut them down."
 On 9 September 2018, Human Rights Watch released a 117-page report, "'Eradicating Ideological Viruses': China's Campaign of Repression Against Xinjiang's Muslims", which accused China of the systematic mass detention of tens of thousands of ethnic Uyghurs and other Muslims in political re-education camps without being charged or tried and presented new evidence of the Chinese government's mass arbitrary detention, torture, and mistreatment, and the increasingly pervasive controls on daily life. The report also urged foreign governments to pursue a range of multilateral and unilateral actions against China for its actions, including "targeted sanctions" against those responsible.
On 7 January 2020, CAIR National Executive Director Nihad Awad condemned a tweet by the US Chinese embassy, saying that China was openly admitting to and celebrating forced sterilizations and abortions of Muslim Uyghur women by saying it had "emancipated" them from being "baby-making machines".

Reactions by countries

 In September 2019, Australian Foreign Minister Marise Payne stated, "I have previously raised Australia's concerns about reports of mass detentions of Uyghurs and other Muslim peoples in Xinjiang. We have consistently called for China to cease the arbitrary detention of Uyghurs and other Muslim groups. We have raised these concerns—and we will continue to raise them—both bilaterally and in relevant international meetings."

 In January 2020, the Bahrain Council of Representatives called on the international community to protect Uyghur Muslims in China and "expressed deep concern over the inhumane and painful conditions to which Uyghur Muslims in China are subjected, including the detention of more than one million Muslims in mass detention camps, denial of their most basic rights, the removal of their children, wives and families, their prevention of prayer, worship and religious practices, confronting murder, ill-treatment and torture."

 On 5 March 2021, a group of 65 member states—led by Belarus—expressed their support of China's Xinjiang policy and opposed the "unfounded allegations against China based on disinformation" at the 44th session of Human Rights Council.

 On 15 March 2021, the Walloon Parliament voted to approve a motion condemning the "unacceptable" practices introduced by the Chinese government, including the exploitation of Uyghurs and all other ethnic minorities, in Xinjiang. All parties voted in favor, with the exception of the Workers' Party, which abstained.

 On 22 February 2021, the Canadian House of Commons voted 266–0 to approve a motion that formally recognizes China is committing genocide against its Muslim minorities. Prime Minister Justin Trudeau and his cabinet did not vote.

 On 6 October 2020, Cuba delivered a joint statement with 45 other countries voicing their support of China's measures in Xinjiang.

 Egypt signed both statements at the UN (in July and October 2019) that supported China's Xinjiang policies. Egypt has been accused of deporting Uyghurs to China.

 In November 2019, French Foreign Minister Jean-Yves Le Drian called on China to close down the camps. He also called on China to permit the UN High Commissioner for Human Rights to visit Xinjiang at the earliest possible date to make a report on the situation. The French Ministry of Europe and Foreign Affairs issued a statement on 27 November:

In December 2020, France said it will oppose the proposed Comprehensive Agreement on Investment between the European Union and China over the use of forced labour of Uyghurs.

 In December 2018, leaders of the Muslim organization Muhammadiyah issued an open letter citing reports of violence against the "weak and innocent" community of Uyghurs and asking Beijing to explain. Soon after, Beijing responded by inviting more than a dozen top Indonesian religious leaders to the Xinjiang province and camps, and criticism greatly diminished. Since then, Indonesia's largest Muslim organizations have purportedly treated reports of widespread human rights violations in Xinjiang with skepticism, dismissing them as U.S. propaganda.
 In October 2022, the Indonesian delegation for the UNHCR voted against debate in the chamber on the topic of the treatment of Uyghurs in Xinjiang as it "will not yield meaningful progress," but Ambassador Febrian Ruddyard also stated, "As the world's largest Muslim country and a vibrant democracy, we cannot close our eyes to the plight of our Muslim brothers and sisters."

 In a December 2016 report, the research unit of the Iranian state-owned television's external services said that China is not opposed to Muslims, but instead to pro-Saudi radical ideology. In August 2020, Ali Motahari, a former member of the Iranian Parliament, tweeted that the Iranian government has kept silent about the situation of Muslims in China because the government of Iran needs China's economic support. He said that this silence has been humiliating for the Islamic Republic. Critics of Motahari responded that China was opposed to Wahabism, and had no problem with Islam or Chinese Muslims.
Iran signed an October 2019 letter that publicly expressed support for China's treatment of Uyghurs.

 On 26 November 2019, Japanese Foreign Minister Toshimitsu Motegi said Japan was "monitoring the human rights situation in the Xinjiang Uygur Autonomous Region with concern" and that he brought up Japan's position with State Councilor Wang Yi in their meeting on 25 November.

In November 2017, Kazakhstan's Ambassador to China Shahrat Nuryshev met with Chinese Vice Minister of Foreign Affairs Li Huilai regarding Kazakh diaspora issues.
 On 15 February 2018, Kazakh Foreign Minister Kairat Abdrakhmanov sent a diplomatic note to the Chinese Foreign Ministry, the same day Samarkand, a Kazakhstan citizen, was released from re-education camp. From 17 to 19 April, Kazakh First Deputy Foreign Minister Mukhtar Tleuberdi visited Xinjiang to meet with local officials.

 On 20 May 2021, the Seimas passed a non-binding resolution condemning China's treatment of Uyghurs.

 In September 2020, Malaysia's new government decided not to extradite ethnic Uyghurs to China if Beijing requests it. Despite the government of Malaysia's stance not to get involved in Chinese internal affairs, it has stated that Uyghurs are being oppressed in the country. Mohd Redzuan Md Yusof, minister in the Prime Minister's Department also stated that his government would provide free passage to those refugees who would want to settle in a third country.

 On 25 February, the States General of the Netherlands declared China's treatment of the Uyghur ethnic minority a genocide, the third country to do so.

 On 6 May 2021, the New Zealand Parliament passed a motion condemning China's treatment of the Uyghurs in Xinjiang, but fell short of calling it genocide, due to opposition from the governing Labour Party, who would not pass the motion unless the term 'genocide' was removed.
New Zealand Prime Minister Jacinda Ardern has raised the issue of the Uyghurs on numerous occasions, including in her 2019 meeting with CCP General Secretary Xi Jinping. She did not detail exactly what was said. In July 2019, New Zealand Foreign Minister Winston Peters, asked why New Zealand had signed the letter to the president of the United Nations Human Rights Council criticizing Beijing for its treatment of ethnic Uyghurs in the Xinjiang region stated, "Because we believe in human rights, we believe in freedom and we believe in the liberty of personal beliefs and the right to hold them."
In 2017, National MP Todd McClay represented his party in Beijing before a dialogue organised by the International Liaison Department of the Chinese Communist Party. McClay also referred to the Xinjiang internment camps as "vocational training centers" in line with CCP talking points.

 Pakistan signed both statements at the UN (in July and October 2019) that supported China's Xinjiang policies.
 On 19 January 2020, Pakistani Prime Minister Imran Khan was asked why he was not more outspoken about the situation of Uyghurs in China. He said that he has not been as outspoken primarily because the human rights situation in Kashmir and Citizenship Amendment Act were problems much larger in scale. He said that the second reason was that China has been a great friend of Pakistan and had helped Pakistan through their toughest time with the economic crisis, so that "the way we deal with China is that when we talk about things, we talk about privately. We do not talk about things with China in public right now because they are very sensitive. That's how they deal with issues."

In July 2020, Xi Jinping met with Palestinian President Mahmoud Abbas to express Beijing's "full support" for the two-state solution to the Israeli-Palestinian conflict, saying that "China and Palestine are good brothers, good friends and good partners". Abbas then voiced support for China's "legitimate position on Hong Kong, Xinjiang and other matters concerning China's core interests."

 On 4 February 2019, Russian Foreign Minister Sergey Lavrov said he was not aware of reports about political re-education camps in China's Xinjiang Uygur Autonomous Region, though he had seen the US actively raising the issue.
 In July 2019, Russia signed the letter supporting China at the UN Human Rights Council.
 On 9 October 2019, Lavrov said that "China has repeatedly given explanations concerning the accusations that you have mentioned probably citing our Western colleagues. We have no reason to take any steps other than the procedures that exist at the UN that I mentioned, such as at the Human Rights Council and its Universal Periodic Reviews."

 In February 2019, Saudi Arabia's Crown Prince Mohammad bin Salman defended China's use of the camps, saying "China has the right to carry out anti-terrorism and de-extremisation work for its national security."
 Saudi Arabia was among the 24 countries (excluding China) that backed China's position at the UN Human Rights Council in July 2019, and again at the UN General Assembly in October 2020.

 On 6 November 2018 during the UN Human Rights Council's Universal Periodic Review of China, Switzerland called on China to close down its detention camps in Xinjiang, to grant the UN High Commissioner for Human Rights unrestricted access to Xinjiang, and to allow an independent UN investigation of the detention camps.
 On 26 November 2019, the Federal Department of Foreign Affairs called on the Chinese government to address the concerns raised by many states and to allow the UN unhindered access to the region.

 In December 2019, the Syrian Ministry of Foreign Affairs and Expatriates defended China's actions in Xinjiang days after the US condemnation, stating that it is a "blatant interference by the US in the internal affairs of the People's Republic of China." The statement concluded that "Syria emphasizes the right of China to preserve its sovereignty, people, territorial integrity, and security and protect the security and property of the state and individuals."

 On 2 October 2018 the Minister of Foreign Affairs, Joseph Wu, used the MOFA's official Twitter account to send out a Radio Free Asia article titled "Xinjiang Authorities Secretly Transferring Uyghur Detainees to Jails Throughout China" and stated that, "relocation of Uyghurs to re-education camps around China warrants the world's attention."
 On 5 July 2019, Joseph Wu, again on Twitter, sent out a BBC News article titled "China Muslims: Xinjiang schools used to separate children from families" and called on China to "Close the camps! Send the children home!"
 On 18 November 2019, the MOFA's official Twitter sent out a New York Times article titled "'Absolutely No Mercy': Leaked Files Expose How China Organized Mass Detentions of Muslims" saying, "This chilling NYTimes expose on the mass detention of Muslims by China is a must-read! Leaked internal documents tell the truth about the crackdown on ethnic minorities in Xinjiang, as well as the 'ruthless & extraordinary campaign' run by senior Communist Party officials."

 In February 2019, after Turkish media had picked up rumors of Uyghur musician Abdurehim Heyit dying in detention, the Spokesperson for the Turkish Foreign Ministry denounced China for "violating the fundamental human rights of Uyghur Turks and other Muslim communities in the Xinjiang Uygur Autonomous Region." In July 2019, Turkish journalists from Milliyet and Aydınlık interviewed Heyit in Ürümqi who denied that Uyghurs had problems in China.
 In July 2019, Chinese state media reported that when Turkish President Erdoğan visited China, he said, "It is a fact that the people of all ethnicities in Xinjiang are leading a happy life amid China's development and prosperity." Turkish officials then claimed the paraphrase was mistranslated by the Turkish side, saying it should rather have read "hopes the peoples of China's Xinjiang live happily in peace and prosperity". Erdoğan also said that some people were seeking to "abuse" the Xinjiang crisis to jeopardize the "Turkish–Chinese relationship". Some Uyghurs in Turkey have expressed concerns that they may face deportation back to China.

 On 3 July 2018, at a U.K. Parliamentary roundtable, the Rights Practice helped to organize a Parliamentary Round-table on increased repression and forced assimilation in Xinjiang. Rahima Mahmut, an Uyghur singer and human rights activist, gave a personal testimony about the violations suffered by the Uyghur community. Dr. Adrian Zenz, European School of Culture and Theology, (Germany), outlined the evidence of a large scale and sophisticated political re-education network designed to detain people for long periods and which the Chinese government officially denies.
 On 16 December 2020, the U.K. said there was credible, growing, and troubling evidence of forced labor among Uyghur Muslims in Xinjiang. Nigel Adams, Minister of State for Asia told Parliament, "Evidence of forced Uyghur labor within Xinjiang, and in other parts of China, is credible, it is growing and deeply troubling to the UK government." Adams said firms had a duty to ensure their supply chains were free of forced labor.
 On 12 January 2021, the Foreign Secretary, Dominic Raab, announced if British businesses fail to ensure their supply chains are free of slave labour could face fines. Raab appeared to be targeting China's mistreatment of internees in Xinjiang, saying it was Britain's "moral duty" to respond to the "far-reaching" evidence of human rights abuses being perpetrated in Xinjiang.
 On 23 April, a group of MPs led by Sir Iain Duncan Smith passed a motion declaring the mass detention of Uyghur Muslims in Xinjiang province a genocide. The United Kingdom is the fourth country in the world to make such action. In response, the Chinese Embassy in London said "The unwarranted accusation by a handful of British MPs that there is 'genocide' in Xinjiang is the most preposterous lie of the century..."

 On 3 April 2018, U.S. Senator Marco Rubio and Representative Chris Smith sent a letter urging Ambassador to China Terry Branstad to launch an investigation into the reported mass detention of Uyghurs in political re-education camps in Xinjiang.
 On 26 July 2018, Vice President of the United States Mike Pence raised the re-education camps issue at Ministerial to Advance Religious Freedom. He said that "Sadly, as we speak as well, Beijing is holding hundreds of thousands, and possibly millions, of Uyghur Muslims in so-called 're-education camps', where they're forced to endure around-the-clock political indoctrination and to denounce their religious beliefs and their cultural identity as the goal."
 On 26 July 2018, the Congressional-Executive Commission on China, an independent agency of the U.S. government which monitors human rights and rule of law developments in the People's Republic of China, released a report that said as many as a million people are or have been detained in what are being called "political re-education" centers, the largest mass incarceration of an ethnic minority population in the world today. On 27 July 2018, The U.S. Embassy & Consulate in China released Ministerial to Advance Religious Freedom Statement on China, which mentioned the detention of hundreds of thousands, and possibly millions, of Uyghurs and members of other Muslim minority groups in "political re-education camps", and called the Chinese government to release immediately all those arbitrarily detained.
 On 28 August 2018, U.S. senator Marco Rubio and 16 other members of Congress urged the United States to impose sanctions under the Global Magnitsky Human Rights Accountability Act against Chinese officials who are responsible for human rights abuses in Xinjiang. In a letter to Secretary of State Mike Pompeo and Treasury Secretary Steven Mnuchin, they called for the sanctions on Chen Quanguo who is the current Communist Party Secretary of the Xinjiang (the highest post in an administrative unit of China) and six other Chinese officials and two businesses that make surveillance equipment in Xinjiang.
 U.S. Secretary of State Mike Pompeo criticized Iran's Supreme Leader Ayatollah Ali Khamenei for his refusal to condemn the Chinese government's repressions against the Uyghurs.
On 3 May 2019, U.S. Assistant Secretary of Defense for Indo-Pacific Security Affairs Randall Schriver condemns the detention of Uyghurs as concentration camps.
On 11 September 2019, the U.S. Senate unanimously passed the Uyghur Human Rights Policy Act. On 3 December 2019, the U.S. House of Representatives passed a stronger version of the Uyghur Human Rights Policy Act by a vote of 407 to 1. The bill was signed into law on 17 June 2020.
On 8 January 2020, the Congressional-Executive Commission on China released its annual report, which stated that Chinese government actions in Xinjiang may constitute crimes against humanity.
In April 2020, United States lawmakers from the Congressional-Executive Commission on China, led by Jim McGovern and Marco Rubio, introduced the Uyghur Forced Labor Prevention Act that aims to prevent the importation of Chinese products tied to evidence of unfree labor.
In June 2020, Trump's former national security adviser John Bolton claimed that President Donald Trump told Chinese leader Xi Jinping that China's decision to detain Uyghurs in re-education camps was "exactly the right thing to do".
US Congress passed the Uyghur Human Rights Policy Act which was signed into law by President Trump on 17 June 2020. On 9 July 2020, the Trump administration imposed sanctions and visa restrictions against senior Chinese officials, including Chen Quanguo. The same month, sanctions under the Global Magnitsky Act were levied against the Xinjiang Production and Construction Corps and related officials including Sun Jinlong and Peng Jiarui.
On 14 September 2020, the U.S. Department of Homeland Security blocked imports to the United States of products from four entities in Xinjiang: all products made with labor from the Lop County No. 4 Vocational Skills Education and Training Center; hair products made in the Lop County Hair Product Industrial Park; apparel produced by Yili Zhuowan Garment Manufacturing Co., Ltd. and Baoding LYSZD Trade and Business Co., Ltd; and cotton produced and processed by Xinjiang Junggar Cotton and Linen Co., Ltd.
On 22 September 2020, the United States House of Representatives passed the Uyghur Forced Labor Prevention Act.
On 19 January 2021, US Secretary of State Mike Pompeo designated China's treatment of the Uyghurs a genocide, making the United States the first country in the world to make such a designation. China responded a day later by sanctioning US officials in the outgoing Trump administration, including Pompeo, for their criticisms of China's treatment of the Uyghurs.
On 9 July 2021 The US Department of Commerce's Bureau of Industry and Security (BIS) added 14 entities, that are based in the People's Republic of China (PRC) and have enabled Beijing's campaign of repression, mass detention, and high-technology surveillance against Uyghurs, Kazakhs, and members of other Muslim minority groups in the Xinjiang Uyghur Autonomous Regions of China (XUAR), where the PRC continues to commit genocide and crimes against humanity, to the Entity List. The Entity List is a tool utilized by BIS to restrict the export, reexport, and transfer (in-country) of items subject to the  Export Administration Regulations.

Responses from China 
 The Chinese government officially legalized re-education camps in Xinjiang in October 2018. Prior to that, when international media had asked about the re-education camps, China's Ministry of Foreign Affairs said that they have not heard of this situation.
 On 12 August 2018, a Chinese state-run tabloid, Global Times, defended the crackdown in Xinjiang after a U.N. anti-discrimination committee raised concerns over China's treatment of Uyghurs. According to the Global Times, China prevented Xinjiang from becoming 'China's Syria' or 'China's Libya', and local authorities' policies saved countless lives and avoided a 'great tragedy'.
 On 13 August 2018, at a UN meeting in Geneva, the delegation from China told the United Nations Human Rights Committee that "There is no such thing as re-education centers in Xinjiang and it is completely untrue that China put 1 million Uyghurs into re-education camps". A Chinese delegation said that "Xinjiang citizens, including the Uyghurs, enjoy equal freedom and rights."  They said that "Some minor offenders of religious extremism or separatism have been taken to 'vocational education' and employment training centers with a view to assisting in their rehabilitation".
 On 14 August 2018, Chinese Foreign Ministry spokesman Lu Kang said "anti-China forces had made false accusations against China for political purposes and a few foreign media outlets misrepresented the committee's discussions and were smearing China's anti-terror and crime-fighting measures in Xinjiang" after a UN human rights committee raised concern over reported mass detentions of ethnic Uyghurs.
 On 21 August 2018, Liu Xiaoming, the Ambassador of China to the United Kingdom, wrote an article in response to a Financial Times report entitled "Crackdown in Xinjiang: Where have all the people gone?". Liu's response said: "The education and training measures taken by the local government of Xinjiang have not only effectively prevented the infiltration of religious extremism and helped those lost in extremist ideas to find their way back, but also provided them with employment training in order to build a better life."
 On 10 September 2018, China's Foreign Ministry spokesperson Geng Shuang condemned a report about the re-education camps issued by Human Rights Watch. He said: "This organisation has always been full of prejudice and distorting facts about China." Geng also added that: "Xinjiang is enjoying overall social stability, sound economic development and harmonious co-existence of different ethnic groups. The series of measures implemented in Xinjiang are meant to improve stability, development, solidarity and people's livelihood, crack down on ethnic separatist activities and violent and terrorist crimes, safeguard national security, and protect people's life and property."
 On 11 September 2018, China called for UN human rights chief Michelle Bachelet to "respect its sovereignty", after she urged China to allow monitors into Xinjiang and expressed concern about the situation there. Chinese Foreign Ministry spokesman Geng Shuang said: "China urges the U.N. human rights high commissioner and office to scrupulously abide by the mission and principles of the U.N. charter, respect China's sovereignty, fairly and objectively carry out its duties, and not listen to one-sided information".
 On 16 October 2018, a CCTV prime-time program aired a 15-minute episode on what was termed as Xinjiang's 'Vocational Skills Educational Training Centers', featuring the Muslim internees. Sinologist Manya Koetse documented that it received a mixture of supportive and critical responses on the Sina Weibo social media platform.
 In March 2019, against the background of the US considering imposing sanctions against Chen Quanguo, who is the region's most senior Communist Party official, Xinjiang governor Shohrat Zakir refuted international claims of concentration camps and re-education camps, instead comparing the institutions to boarding schools.
 On 18 March 2019, the Chinese government released a white paper about the counter-terrorism, de-radicalization in Xinjiang. The white paper claims "A country under the rule of law, China respects and protects human rights in accordance with the principles of its Constitution." The white paper also argues that Xinjiang has not had violent terrorist cases for more than two consecutive years, extremist penetration has been effectively curbed, and social security has improved significantly.
 In July 2019, the Chinese government released another white paper that claims "The Uygur people adopted Islam not of their own volition ... but had it forced upon them by religious wars and the ruling class."
In November 2019, the Chinese ambassador to the United Kingdom responded to questions about newly leaked documents on Xinjiang by calling the documents "fake news."
 On 6 December 2019, China's Foreign Ministry spokesperson Hua Chunying accused the US of hypocrisy on human rights issues relating to allegations of torture at Guantanamo Bay detention camp.
 In September 2020, amid condemnation from Western countries, Chinese paramount leader Xi Jinping acclaimed the success of his policies in Xinjiang in a 2-day conference expected to set the country's policy for the next years. The Chinese government published a white paper defending its "vocational training centers," claiming that the regional government organised 'employment-oriented training' and labour skills for 1.29 million workers a year from 2014 to 2019.
On 7 January 2021, the US Chinese embassy published a tweet that said: “The minds of (Uighur) women in Xinjiang were emancipated and gender equality and reproductive health were promoted, making them no longer baby-making machines,” which drew sharp criticism from human rights groups as well as Sam Brownback, the US envoy on international religious freedom. Subsequently, the tweet was deleted and Twitter locked the embassy's account.
In March 2021, following sanctions imposed on several Chinese officials by the European Union, the United States, the United Kingdom and Canada, the Chinese government responded with sanctions on several individuals and groups that had criticized China over the camps, including five European Parliament members (among them Reinhard Butikofer, the head of the European Parliament's delegation to China), German scholar Adrian Zenz, and the non-profit Alliance of Democracies Foundation.
In June 2021, ProPublica and The New York Times documented a Chinese government-backed propaganda campaign on Twitter and Youtube involving more than 5000 videos analysed. They showed Uyghurs in Xinjiang denying abuses and scolding foreign officials and multinational corporations who had questioned China's human rights record in the province. Some of the videos' accounts were removed on Youtube as part of the company's efforts to combat spam and influence operations.
In October 2022, the Australian Strategic Policy Institute documented a number of CCP-backed Uyghur influencers in Xinjiang posting propaganda videos on Chinese and Western social media which pushed back against abuse allegations. Some of the influencers' accounts were suspended on Twitter for alleged inauthenticity.

Response from dissidents
On 10 August 2018, about 47 Chinese intellectuals and others issued an appeal against what they describe as "shocking human rights atrocities perpetrated in Xinjiang".

In December 2019, during the anti-government protests in Hong Kong, a mixed crowd of young and elderly people, numbering around 1,000 and dressed in black and wearing masks to shield their identities, held up signs reading "Free Uyghur, Free Hong Kong" and "Fake 'autonomy' in China results in genocide". They rallied calmly, waving Uyghur flags and posters. The local riot police pepper sprayed demonstrators to disperse the crowd.

International Criminal Court's complaint
In July 2020, the East Turkistan National Awakening Movement and the East Turkistan Government in Exile filed a complaint with the International Criminal Court calling for it to investigate PRC officials for crimes committed against Uyghurs, including allegations of genocide. In December 2020, the International Criminal Court declined to take investigative action against China on the basis of not having jurisdiction over China for most of the alleged crimes.

See also

Notes

References

External links

 
 Xinjiang Documentation Project at the University of British Columbia
 Xinjiang Data Project at the Australian Strategic Policy Institute 
 Regulation for the Removal of Extremism in the Xinjiang Uygur Autonomous Region (Wikisource, in Chinese)

 
2017 establishments in China
21st-century human rights abuses
2010s in China
2020s in China
Cultural assimilation
Human rights of ethnic minorities in China
Internment camps
Linguistic discrimination
Anti-Islam sentiment in China
Islamophobia in China
Political repression in China
Language policy in Xinjiang
Racism in China
Separatism in China
Total institutions
Violence against Muslims
Xi Jinping
Religious persecution by communists
Xinjiang conflict
Counterterrorism in China
Ethnic cleansing in Asia
Uyghurs
Kazakhs in China
Islam-related controversies in Asia
Human rights abuses in China
Communist repression
Collective punishment
Genocides in Asia